Scuola ('school' in Italian; plural scuole) is part of the name of many primary and secondary schools in Italy, Italian-language schools abroad, and institutes of tertiary education in Italy. Those are not listed in this disambiguation article. It may also refer to:

Associations
 The Scuole Grandi of Venice, religious confraternities with art collections
 The Scuole Piccole of Venice, religious confraternities

Artistic movements
 Scuola Romana or Scuola di via Cavour, a 20th-century art movement in Rome
 Giovane scuola, a group of Italian composers of the late 19th and early 20th centuries

Other
 La scuola, 1995 Italian film
 CISL Scuola, Italian labor union for teachers